Lauren Perry (born 5 April 2001) is a Northern Irish footballer who plays as a goalkeeper for Dundee United in the Scottish Women's Premier League and for the Northern Ireland national team. She previously played for Linfield in Northern Ireland, Blackburn Rovers in England and Forfar Farmington in Scotland. She made her international debut for Northern Ireland in 2018.

Club career
In March 2017, Perry signed for Linfield, the club where her father, Alan Perry, was assistant first team coach. She made her Linfield debut in a 5–2 win against Sion Swifts on 22 March 2017. On 22 August 2017, Perry made her Champions League debut in a 2017–18 qualifying round match against PK-35 Vantaa. In her first season with the club she was named Women's Premiership player of the year and NIFWA Women’s Personality of the Year.

On 2 October 2019, Perry signed with Blackburn Rovers in the English FA Women's Championship, shortly after former Linfield teammate Louise McDaniel made the same move. In August 2020 she moved to Scotland, joining SWPL 1 team Forfar Farmington. On 18 April 2021, she scored with a free kick from 25 yards to earn Forfar a 1–1 draw against Heart of Midlothian and was subsequently nominated for the league's Player of the Month award.

In July 2021, Perry was one of a number of players to leave Forfar for lower division teams shortly before they were forced to pull out of senior football. She joined Dundee United in the second tier of the SWPL, and was part of their squad that won the SWPL2 title in the 2021-22 season.

International
On 15 September 2018, Perry made her senior international debut for Northern Ireland in a 2019 FIFA Women's World Cup qualifying defeat to Norway. She made nine saves and was voted player of the match.

Personal life
Perry comes from Ballynahinch, County Down. While playing for Blackburn, she studied for a degree in Sport and PE at the University of Central Lancashire.

Honours

Club
Linfield
 NIFL Women's Premiership: 2017, 2018, 2019
 NIFL Women's Premiership League Cup: 2018

Dundee United
 Scottish Women's Premier League 2: 2021-22

References

External links
 
 
 

2001 births
Living people
Blackburn Rovers L.F.C. players
Women's association footballers from Northern Ireland
Northern Ireland women's international footballers
Women's association football goalkeepers
Forfar Farmington F.C. players
Linfield Ladies F.C. players
Women's Premiership (Northern Ireland) players
Scottish Women's Premier League players
Dundee United W.F.C. players